In algebra, the nilradical of a Lie algebra is a nilpotent ideal, which is as large as possible. 

The nilradical  of a finite-dimensional Lie algebra  is its maximal nilpotent ideal, which exists because the sum of any two nilpotent ideals is nilpotent. It is an ideal in the radical  of the Lie algebra . The quotient of a Lie algebra by its nilradical is a reductive Lie algebra . However, the corresponding short exact sequence

This is in contrast to the Levi decomposition: the short exact sequence

does split (essentially because the quotient  is semisimple).

See also
 Levi decomposition
 Nilradical of a ring, a notion in ring theory.

References

 
 .

Lie algebras